Little Brown Creek is a  long 3rd order tributary to Brown Creek in Anson County, North Carolina.  This creek is located on the right bank of Brown Creek and is different than the one on the left bank located upstream.

Course
Little Brown Creek rises in a pond about 3 miles north of Lowry, North Carolina.  Little Brown Creek then flows north to meet Brown Creek about 0.5 miles southeast of Polkton, North Carolina.

Watershed
Little Brown Creek drains  of area, receives about 48.0 in/year of precipitation, has a topographic wetness index of 432.95 and is about 69% forested.

References

Rivers of North Carolina
Rivers of Anson County, North Carolina
Tributaries of the Pee Dee River